The 2013 LFL Canada Season would have been the second season of LFL Canada and the sixth season of the combined history of the Legends Football League and its predecessor, the Lingerie Football League. LFL Canada intended to feature four teams in four cities across Western Canada, with the Calgary Fillies to replace the suspended Toronto Triumph; Calgary was to join the BC Angels, Regina Rage and the Saskatoon Sirens.

The 2013 season never transpired, and LFL announced, in July 2014, that LFL Canada had been terminated and the teams would fold into a (never formed) LFL North America.

Aborted developments
On June 27, 2013, the 2013 LFL Canada schedule was released. The 2013 regular season was scheduled to begin on September 13, 2013 and conclude on November 9, 2013, with the Legends Cup championship scheduled to be played on November 16, 2013 at Stampede Corral in Calgary, Alberta.

It was announced that a Calgary, Alberta team would join the LFL and be known as the Calgary Fillies, playing home games at the Stampede Corral. As well, the LFL announced that the Toronto Triumph would suspend operations for the 2013 season, ostensibly due to arena concerns.

On September 11, 2013, Ticketmaster began notifying ticket holders in Saskatoon that the team's first home game against Calgary has been cancelled.  No reasons were given for the cancellation, nor a rescheduled date provided.

Legends Football League then moved the season opener to October 5th, then cancelled the 2013 Season before that revised start date. The LFL first blamed a lack of preparation time for the teams due to three new coaching staffs (all except Saskatoon), then confirmed that the league office was not prepared, the stated the inability of USA players to be available to practice with Canadian teams.

The LFL stated that it would be properly prepared for the 2014 season, but in July 2014 announced that LFL Canada had been terminated, with plans to fold the teams into a (never formed) LFL North America, joining teams from the US and Mexico.

Teams

Schedule

LFL Canada Legends Cup

Standings

References

Lingerie Football League
Lingerie Football League
Legends Football League